Ghelman Saray (also Romanized as Ghelmān Sarāy and Ghelmānsarāy; also known as ‘Alam Sarāy, Alma Sarāi, Ālmā Sarāy, Almy saray, Qelmānsarāy, and Qolmān Sarā) is a village in Chehregan Rural District, Tasuj District, Shabestar County, East Azerbaijan Province, Iran. At the 2006 census, its population was 608, in 164 families.

References 

Populated places in Shabestar County